Joseph Rego-Costa (born July 3, 1919 in Fall River, Massachusetts; died April 27, 2002 in Fall River, Massachusetts) was a U.S. soccer right halfback who earned four caps with the United States and was the captain of the team at the 1948 Summer Olympics.

Club career
He played for the Ponta Delgada S.C. which won the 1947 National Challenge Cup and National Amateur Cup.

National and Olympic teams
Based on the 1947 Cup results, the U.S. Soccer Federation selected Ponta Delgada to serve as the United States at the 1947 NAFC Championship. In the first game, the U.S. 5-0 to Mexico and in the second, they lost 5-2 to Cuba. The next year, he was selected as the captain of the U.S. soccer team at the 1948 Summer Olympics. The U.S. lost 9-0 to Italy in the first round.  Rego-Costa played two more full internationals with the U.S. team following the Olympics, an 11-0 loss to Norway and a 5-0 loss to Ireland

He was inducted into the New England Soccer Hall of Fame in 1988.

References

External links
 2001 Newspaper article on Rego-Costa

United States men's international soccer players
Ponta Delgada S.C. players
Olympic soccer players of the United States
Footballers at the 1948 Summer Olympics
Sportspeople from Fall River, Massachusetts
Soccer players from Massachusetts
1919 births
2002 deaths
Association football defenders
American soccer players